Irving Ampofo Adjei (born 6 October 1994), known professionally as Headie One (formerly Headz), is a British rapper and singer. In 2018 he released his second solo mixtape, titled ‘The One’, which included the single "Know Better" featuring rapper RV, it became an "underground hit". Headie One is a member of the UK drill group OFB and is considered to be a pioneer innovator of the UK drill scene.

He is best known for his tracks "18hunna" featuring rapper Dave, "Only You Freestyle" featuring rapper Drake, "Ain't It Different" featuring rappers AJ Tracey and Stormzy and his solo single "Both". The track "18hunna" peaked at number 6 on the UK Singles Chart, while "Only You Freestyle" peaked at number 5 on the UK Singles Chart and "Ain't It Different" peaked at number 2 on the UK Singles Chart.

Headie One has released a series of mixtapes. In 2019, he released his seventh and first mainstream mixtape titled Music x Road, which peaked at number 5 on the UK Albums Chart. In 2020, he released his debut album titled Edna—an album that pays homage to his mother, Edna Duah—which peaked at number 1 on the UK Albums Chart.

Headie One has been involved in numerous altercations and controversies; he has been sentenced to spend time in jail on four separate occasions.

Early life 
Adjei grew up in the Broadwater Farm housing estate in Tottenham, London. He is of Ghanaian origin and can speak Twi. His mother Edna Duah died when Adjei was three, and he was therefore raised by his father and sister.

In his youth, he was "obsessed" with football and played for local team Haringey Borough F.C. He was due to have a trial with Stevenage F.C. before an ankle fracture led to his exit from the sport.

He first began rapping in his early teens, though only began focusing on it after his first release from prison. His moniker derives from a childhood nickname due to his head's resemblance to a 50p coin.

Career

2010–2019: Career beginnings and mixtapes

Adjei began releasing music in the early 2010s under the name Headz, including as part of a group named Star Gang. In 2014, he released his only mixtape under that alias, titled Headz or Tails. Also part of Star Gang was fellow Tottenham rapper RV – he and Headie One became frequent collaborators, including co-releasing the mixtapes Sticks & Stones (2016) and Drillers x Trappers (2017). Together they formed part of OFB, a UK drill group based in the Broadwater Farm estate.

In February 2018, he released his next solo mixtape as Headie One, titled The One. This included "Know Better" with RV, which became an "underground hit".[6] This was his first release that was signed to Relentless Records, a subsidiary of Sony Music.[7] In May, he was featured on "Missing", a Belly Squad track that peaked at number 84 on the UK Singles Chart.[8] This was followed by another solo mixtape, The One Two, in June 2018, which entered the UK Albums Chart at number 32.[9] In November, he performed on his first national UK tour.[10]

In January 2019, his single "18Hunna", featuring Dave, entered the UK chart at number 6 – the highest a drill artist ever charted prior to "Body" by Russ Millions and Tion Wayne.[11][12] In March, Adjei released his sixth mixtape, and third with RV, Drillers x Trappers II.[13] It entered the UK Albums Chart at number 21.[14] "Match Day", the first single from the mixtape, entered the Singles Chart at number 86.[11] In July, he featured on the "I Spy" single by Krept and Konan, which peaked at number 18.[15]

2019–2020: Music x Road 

In August 2019, Adjei released his seventh mixtape in five years, Music x Road.[16] The release was praised by critics,[16][17][18] and was noted for being a move away from his usual sound – with NME describing it as being "often far from drill".[17] It entered the UK Albums Chart at number 5 – his highest chart placing to date.[11] Other than the previously released "18Hunna", several tracks from the mixtape also charted, such as "Back to Basics" with Skepta, "Rubbery Bandz" and "Both".[11]

In December 2019, he featured on Stormzy's new album Heavy Is the Head on the song "Audacity". In April 2020, Adjei collaborated with Fred Again… to release his mixtape Gang. In July 2020, he released a single featuring Drake called "Only You Freestyle" produced by M1onthebeat which peaked at number 5. In August 2020, his single "Ain’t It Different" with Stormzy & AJ Tracey peaked at number two on the UK Singles Chart -  his highest charting single to date. The song was certified platinum by British Phonographic Industry on 21 January 2021.

2020–present: Edna and Too Loyal for My Own Good

In October 2020, his debut album Edna topped the UK charts.[19] The album was dedicated to his late mother of the same name. It has garnered plenty of praise within the music world. NME praised the "melancholy, minor-key trap beats requisite of in-vogue modern hip-hop",[20] while The Times described Adjei as the "breakout star of drill".[21]

On 1 October 2021, he released his ninth mixtape, Too Loyal for My Own Good. He later released the single "Came In The Scene" on 5 May 2022. this was followed up by the single "Can't Be Us" with Abra Cadabra and Bandokay on 5 August 2022. Following a number of features with European artists, Adjei released his tenth mixtape No Borders: European Collaboration Project on 11 November 2022, featuring Luciano, Koba LaD, Gazo, and more.

On 8 December 2022 he released the single "50s". Following months of anticipation and previews, he released the single "Martin's Sofa" on 13 January 2023.

Personal life
Adjei is an avid supporter of Manchester United.

Legal issues
As a teenager, Adjei had been imprisoned three times, including for dealing crack cocaine and heroin, most recently in 2014.

On 8 January 2020, Adjei was sentenced to six months for possession of a knife and imprisoned for a fourth time. He was released early in April 2020.

Controversy 
In January 2018, he was reportedly attacked by rivals at the University of Bedfordshire. A video of the assault was posted on Snapchat and then YouTube, resulting in an "all-out gang war". Headie responded with a diss track "Know Better".

In March of that year, his concert at the Barbican Centre was shut down by the Metropolitan Police. The police had previously linked his music in connection with rising knife crime in London. In an interview in April, Headie claimed that "Only a fool would say that drill music is the root of the problem of violence in the capital." Associations between London gang culture ("the war between Tottenham and Wood Green"), drill music and social media were examined in a BBC Radio Four programme File on Four 8 March 2020, focused on three violent murders.

On 17 November 2020, Adjei was involved in an altercation with rapper Tion Wayne on board a flight from Dubai to London in which the rapper Morrisson tried to break up shortly after boarding.

On 23 November 2022, Adjei was involved in a fight against rapper E1 (3x3) at the Sony Music Building in London. An employee said "It was one of the most frightening experiences of my life. You don’t expect to go to work and to be dragged into something like this…there was blood on the floor [...] It was terrifying." Sony issued a statement, saying "Sony Music takes the safety of its staff very seriously. This is now a police matter, so we cannot comment further."

Discography

Studio albums

Mixtapes

Collaborations

Singles

As lead artist

As featured artist

Promotional singles

Other charted songs

Guest appearances

Filmography

Web

References 

21st-century British rappers
People from Tottenham
Rappers from London
Living people
English male rappers
English people of Ghanaian descent
Black British male rappers
UK drill musicians
Gangsta rappers
British trap musicians
1994 births
Relentless Records artists